Tauchik (Tauşyq, تاۋشىق) is a town in Mangystau Region, southwest Kazakhstan, with a population of 2,600.

References

Mangystau Region
Cities and towns in Kazakhstan